The Natural Economic Order (in short NWO; published in Bern in 1916) is considered Silvio Gesell's most important book. It is a work on monetary reform and land reform. It attempts to provide a solid basis for economic liberalism in contrast to the 20th-century trend of collectivism and planned economy.

The work was translated into English by Philip Pye in 1929.

References

External links
 Full text of The Natural Economic Order

Freiwirtschaft
1916 non-fiction books